The Liberal Democratic Order (Ordem Liberal Democrata, or OLD) is a São Toméan political party, officially founded after the 2014 general elections, in São Tomé, by a group of citizens outraged by what they regard as the cyclical political crisis in the country and the current inability of the ruling class to manage public affairs in a transparent, orderly and productive manner.

The OLD seeks to uphold the rule of law and representative democracy, and struggles to build a more just, united and prosperous society through the promotion of the Nation, Order, and Excellence as fundamental pillars of the State.

References

Politics of São Tomé and Príncipe
Political parties in São Tomé and Príncipe